An apical (or medial or subclavicular) group of six to twelve glands is situated partly posterior to the upper portion of the Pectoralis minor and partly above the upper border of this muscle.

Its only direct territorial afferents are those that accompany the cephalic vein, and one that drains the upper peripheral part of the mamma. However, it receives the efferents of all the other axillary glands.

The efferent vessels of the subclavicular group unite to form the subclavian trunk, which opens either directly into the junction of the internal jugular and subclavian veins or into the jugular lymphatic trunk; on the left side it may end in the thoracic duct.

A few efferents from the subclavicular glands usually pass to the inferior deep cervical glands.

Additional images

References

External links
 

Lymphatics of the upper limb